The Martin Building is a historic seven-story building in El Paso, Texas. It is 25.91 metre high. Built in 1916–1917, it was initially an office building for M.D. Roberts and William Martin Banner. From 1950 to 1979, it belonged to the El Paso Electric Company. It was acquired by Lane Gaddy in 2011 and converted into residential apartments in 2016.

The building was designed in the Chicago School architectural style by Brauhton and Leibert. It has been listed on the National Register of Historic Places since August 8, 1984. 

The city of El Paso added a historical plaque in 2018.

References

Buildings and structures completed in 1916
Buildings and structures in El Paso, Texas
Chicago school architecture in Texas	
National Register of Historic Places in El Paso County, Texas